Galley Common is a suburb of Nuneaton, Warwickshire, England. The community is a ward on the western fringe of Nuneaton and Bedworth district, on the border with North Warwickshire district, with a population taken at the 2011 census of 8,233. 

The village comprises a school, several small shops, riding stables, a social club, a small industrial estate and farmland. It is close to the villages of Ansley, Astley, Arley and Old Arley. It was previously a coal mining village separate to Nuneaton, and is still occasionally referred to as a village distinct from the town. The main social areas of the village are The Stute, St Peter's Church and the primary school.

School
The Galley Common Infant School is situated in just on the outskirts of the village at the top of the hill and are surrounded by trees and fields. The school is a successful, popular institution with children aged from 4 to 7. There are five classes: two Reception classes, one straight Year 1 class; a mixed Year 1 and 2 class and a straight Year 2 class. There is a riding school for the disabled in Galley Common Village.

References

External links

 The Nuneaton Local History Group
 A historical website chronicling the Castle which formerly stood in Weddington until its demolition in 1928.
 Nuneaton and Bedworth borough council

Areas of Nuneaton